Arthur John O'Bryan (20 May 1923 – 9 December 1990) was an Australian rules footballer who played with Fitzroy in the Victorian Football League (VFL) during the 1940s. He played on the half back flank in his club's 1944 Grand Final triumph.

O'Bryan also served in the Australian Army during World War II.

References

External links

2004 obituary of Maurie Hearn, mentioning Clen Denning and Laurie Bickerton as the surviving members of the Maroons' 1944 side

1923 births
Australian rules footballers from Victoria (Australia)
Fitzroy Football Club players
Fitzroy Football Club Premiership players
1990 deaths
One-time VFL/AFL Premiership players
Australian Army personnel of World War II